Epitaph is the second and final studio album by German death metal band Necrophagist released by Relapse Records on August 3, 2004.  Unlike on Onset of Putrefaction, guitarist and vocalist Muhammed Suiçmez recorded the album alongside a full band instead of recording it by himself. Though most uncredited, guitarist Christian Münzner, who later departed from the band and joined Obscura, confirmed he wrote at least half of the lead guitar parts as well as several basslines on the album. The track "Only Ash Remains" incorporates the melody of the "Montagues and Capulets" segment of the ballet Romeo and Juliet by Sergei Prokofiev.

Track listing
All songs written by Muhammed Suiçmez except where noted.

Personnel 
Necrophagist
 Muhammed Suiçmez - vocals, lead and rhythm guitars
 Christian Münzner - lead guitar 
 Stephan Fimmers - bass guitar
 Hannes Grossmann - drumsAdditional personnel'''
 Christoph Brandes - recorded drums and vocals
 Bob Katz  -   mastering

References 

2004 albums
Necrophagist albums
Relapse Records albums